Uncial 050 (in the Gregory-Aland numbering), Cι1 (von Soden), is a Greek uncial manuscript of the New Testament, written on parchment. Palaeographically it has been assigned to the 9th century. Formerly it was labelled by O or We.

Description 

The codex contains the text of the Gospel of John, with a numerous lacunae, on 19 parchment leaves. Some leaves have survived in a fragmentary condition. The text is written in one column per page, 5-9 lines per page, 17-24 letters in line. The uncial letters are large. It has breathings and accents.

The biblical text is surrounded by a catena. The text of commentary is written in minuscule.

It contains text John 1:1.3-4; 2:17-3:8.12-13.20-22, 4:7-14, 20:10-13.15-17.

Verse 21:25 is repeated twice and 20:17 even thrice.

Text 
The Greek text of the codex is mixed with the Byzantine, Alexandrian, and Western readings. Several times it concurs with Papyrus 75 (John 2:17; 3:12 etc.). Aland placed it in Category III.

In John 3:12 it has textual variant πιστευετε (you believe) – instead of πιστευσετε (you will believe) – along with the manuscripts Papyrus 75 and Uncial 083.

History 

Possibly the codex was written in Athos peninsula. The Moscow fragment was brought from the Dionysiou monastery.

The fragment John 4:7-14 (three leaves) was discovered by Bradshaw in 1863. Kitchin show it for  Tischendorf (1865).

It was examined by Tregelles.

The codex is divided and located in four places. 2 leaves are housed at the Εθνική Βιβλιοθήκη (1371) in Athens, 7 leaves in the Dionysiou monastery 2 (71), in Athos, 7 leaves in the State Historical Museum (V. 29, S. 119), and 3 leaves in the Christ Church (Wake 2,3).

See also 

 List of New Testament uncials
 Textual criticism

References

Further reading 

 B. Ehlers, "Eine Katene zum Johannes-Evangelium in Moskau, auf dem Athos (Dionysiou), in Athen and in Oxford (050)", ANTF 3, pp. 96–133.
 C. R. Gregory, "Textkritik des Neuen Testaments", Leipzig 1900, vol. 1, pp. 59, 78-79.
 S. P. Tregelles, Codex Zacynthius. Greek Palimpsest Fragments of the Gospel of Saint Luke (London, 1861), pp. 105–109

External links 
 Uncial 050 at the Wieland Willker, "Textual Commentary"

Greek New Testament uncials
9th-century biblical manuscripts
Athos manuscripts
Manuscripts of the National Library of Greece
Dionysiou Monastery